Adult Contemporary is a chart published by Billboard ranking the top-performing songs in the United States in the adult contemporary music (AC) market.  In 1980, 20 songs topped the chart, based on playlists submitted by radio stations.

The first number one of the year was "Send One Your Love" by Stevie Wonder, which retained its position from the final chart of 1979, and held the top spot for the first two weeks of 1980.  In the issue of Billboard dated January 19, it was replaced at number one by "Déjà Vu" by Dionne Warwick, who would return to the number one position in the fall with "No Night So Long" and was the only act to achieve more than one AC chart-topper in 1980.  Solo vocalists dominated the top of the chart during the year; male soloists spent 21 weeks at number one and female soloists 20 weeks.  The remainder of the year featured a duet between female singer Teri DeSario and KC, lead vocalist of KC and the Sunshine Band, and just two chart-toppers by groups.  Three of the year's AC number ones also topped Billboards all-genres chart, the Hot 100: "Woman in Love" by Barbra Streisand, Olivia Newton-John's "Magic", and "Lady" by Kenny Rogers.  "Lady", written by Lionel Richie, was a triple chart-topper for Rogers, as it also reached number one on the Hot Country Singles listing.

Four songs tied for the longest unbroken run at number one during the year, each spending five weeks in the top spot.  "Lost in Love" by Air Supply was the first to achieve the feat in April and May, and was immediately followed at the top of the chart by "The Rose" by Bette Midler, which held the position for the same length of time.  Midler's song came from the film of the same name, in which she played a self-destructive rock star based loosely on Janis Joplin, and won the Golden Globe Award for Best Original Song.  Later in the year two other female vocalists had five-week runs at number one: Olivia Newton-John with "Magic" and Barbra Streisand with "Woman in Love".  "Lost in Love" by Air Supply also had a separate spell of a single week at number one, and its total of six weeks atop the chart was the most by a song during the year and meant that Air Supply had the highest total number of weeks in the top spot by an act in 1980.  A second track to have two spells at number one was "Give It All You Got" by jazz trumpeter Chuck Mangione, the official theme tune of the 1980 Winter Olympics.  The final AC number one of the year was "More Than I Can Say" by British vocalist Leo Sayer.

Chart history

References

See also
1980 in music

1980
United States Adult Contemporary
1980 in American music